Gabby's Farm is a Canadian children's television series, which debuted in 2021 on TVOntario. Hosted by Gabby Sharpe, a young girl who lives with her parents on a farm in rural Guelph/Eramosa, the series introduces viewers to the animals, equipment and activities of farm living.

The series received a Canadian Screen Award nomination for Best Children's or Youth Non-fiction Series at the 10th Canadian Screen Awards in 2022.

References

External links

2021 Canadian television series debuts
2020s Canadian children's television series
2020s preschool education television series
Canadian preschool education television series
Television series about animals
Television series about children
TVO original programming
Television shows filmed in Ontario